General elections were held in the Netherlands Antilles on 17 March 1949. This was the first parliamentary election in the Netherlands Antilles after the introduction of universal suffrage. At previous elections ten of the fifteen seats in the Estates of Curaçao were elected, with the remaining five appointed by the governor. This time the elections were about 21 seats in the Estates of the Netherlands Antilles and no seats were appointed by the governor. The 21 elected seats consisted of eight for Curaçao, eight for Aruba, two for Bonaire and one for each of the three SSS Islands.

Results

Curaçao
Population: 95,195 (31 December 1948)
Entitled to vote: 37,688
Valid votes: 30,700
Invalid votes: 476
Seats: 8
Average valid votes per seat: 3,837.5

Aruba
Population: 51,110 (31 December 1948)
Entitled to vote: 12,819
Valid votes: 11,107
Seats: 8
Average valid votes per seat: 1,388

Bonaire
Population: 4,995 (31 December 1948)
Entitled to vote: 2,224
Valid votes: 1,752
Seats: 2
Average valid votes per seat: 876

Saba 
Population: 1.125 (31 December 1948)
Entitled to vote: 451
Valid votes: 385
Invalid votes: 15
Seats: 1

Sint Eustatius 
Population: 921 (31 December 1948)
Entitled to vote: 347
Valid votes: 266
Invalid votes: 15
Seats: 1

Sint Maarten 
Population: 1,568 (31 December 1948)
Entitled to vote: 578
Valid votes: n.a. (only one list of candidates)
Seats: 1

Aftermath 
The new session of the Estates started on 18 April 1949.

At this election women could not only for the first time vote for the parliament, there were also female candidates. None of them however were elected. After M.F. da Costa Gomez gave up his position in the parliament to join the 'College van Algemeen Bestuur' (CAB; early stage of the Council of Ministers), De Lannoy-Elisabeth succeeded him mid 1949 and became the first female member of the parliament in the Netherlands Antilles. Plantz also joined the CAB and was succeeded by Buncamper.

Kroon left the parliament and because Van der Meer turned down the opportunity to succeed him, Isa could become a member of the Estates. At the end of 1949 Arends was succeeded by Amelink and Plantz returned after Buncamper gave up his seat in the parliament.

References 
 Amigoe di Curaçao, 2 February 1949
 Amigoe di Curaçao, 18 March 1949
 Amigoe di Curaçao, 19 March 1949
 De verkiezingen in de Nederlandse Antillen (B. de Gaay Fortman), De West-Indische gids, 1949
 Onderhorigheid en separatisme, Luc Alofs, 2011

Elections in the Netherlands Antilles
Netherlands Antilles